Taygete decemmaculella is a moth in the family Autostichidae. It was described by Vactor Tousey Chambers in 1875. It is found in North America, where it has been recorded from Arizona, Colorado, Maine, Montana, New Mexico, Oklahoma, Utah and Wyoming.

The wingspan is 15–17 mm. The forewings are whitish ocherous with dark gray markings. There is a spot on the base of the costa, sometimes extended to the dorsum. An elongate spot is found on the costa at one-third, with a small round spot close beneath it (the first discal stigma). There is a semi-oval blotch along the costa about two-thirds, confluent with a spot beneath it (the second discal stigma). Some slight irroration (speckling) or one or two dots are found on the apical edge, and sometimes on the tornal edge. The hindwings are pale grayish.

References

Moths described in 1875
Taygete (moth)